"Lyla" is a song by the English rock band Oasis. It was released on 16 May 2005 as the first single from their sixth studio album, Don't Believe the Truth (2005). "Lyla" was the band's first single following the departure of their long-time drummer Alan White, and replaced by Ringo Starr's son and the Who drummer Zak Starkey as an additional drummer of the band.

The song was written by Oasis guitarist Noel Gallagher, who has varyingly described the track as "specifically designed for pogoing", "annoyingly catchy", and the "poppiest thing since "Roll with It". Noting the varied influences of the song, Gallagher says that it's "a bit like... The Soundtrack of Our Lives doing The Who on Skol in a psychedelic city in the sky, or something".

Composition
Gallagher says that the song existed in an early form as a song called "Sing" and dated from the Heathen Chemistry-era.  He also says that the title for the final song should have been "Smiler", but was changed seeing as guitarist Gem Archer's previous band, Heavy Stereo, also had a song called "Smiler". Noel has also joked with the fact that the Lyla in the song is actually the sister of the Sally mentioned in the Oasis single "Don't Look Back in Anger". Also, he had said that the song is a "love song", being about Sally's sister.

Originally claiming that he was not very fond of the song, Noel has said that "Lyla" "isn't even the fifth best track on the album". The song had existed as a demo since the early recording sessions for the album but was all but forgotten until practically the last minute. However, on the Lock the Box feature on the Stop the Clocks, Noel admitted that he "didn't realise how good it was until [we] played it live," while Liam stated that he loved the "guitars, the drums, and the vocals" of the song.

Release
"Lyla" became the band's seventh UK number one, when it reached top spot in the UK Singles Chart in its first week of release. The song also debuted at number 31 on the US Modern Rock Tracks chart, peaking at number 19. It also appeared on the US Bubbling Under Hot 100 chart at number 8, which is roughly equivalent to number 108 on the main Hot 100 chart. It was the first Oasis song to appear on any US singles chart since 2000, when "Go Let It Out" hit number 14 on the Modern Rock chart.

Sony's insistence that "Lyla" be released as the first single from the album helped to fuel the tension between the band and their record label, which led to Oasis not renewing their contract with the record label following the release of Don't Believe the Truth.

Music video
The video features a woman in a flat being harassed by two men, whom she eventually has leave. Shortly after, one of the garages outside her flat opens and she walks through into it and finds herself at a masquerade ball where Oasis are performing the song. The woman eventually leaves and returns to her flat, where she looks out her window and sees the words "Don't Believe The Truth" on the line of garages.

Live performances
When performing on the UK music chart show Top of the Pops, Liam, who was forced to mime to the music, made no secret of the fact, walking away from the microphone with his mouth closed mid-way through lines that he was supposedly 'singing'. It would be Liam's last performance on the programme before its demise in late 2006. However, Noel and the rest of the band would return in August 2005 to perform "The Importance of Being Idle" and later in 2009 to perform their last ever released single "Falling Down". Liam performed the song for the first time as a solo artist at Hackney Round Chapel (where the music video to "Lyla" was filmed) on 5 June 2019.

Track listing
 Digital download and CD single
 "Lyla"  – 5:12
 "Eyeball Tickler"  – 2:47
 "Won't Let You Down"  – 2:48

 UK 7-inch single
 "Lyla" 
 "Eyeball Tickler" 

 UK DVD single
 "Lyla"
 "Lyla" (demo)
 "Can You See It Now?" (documentary)

Personnel
 Liam Gallagher – lead vocals and backing vocals, tambourine
 Noel Gallagher – lead guitar, acoustic guitar and backing vocals
 Gem Archer – rhythm guitar and piano
 Andy Bell – bass
 Zak Starkey – drums

Charts and certifications

Weekly charts

Year-end charts

Certifications

Release history

References

Oasis (band) songs
2005 singles
Song recordings produced by Dave Sardy
Song recordings produced by Noel Gallagher
Songs written by Noel Gallagher
UK Singles Chart number-one singles